Ángel Castresana del Val (born 29 February 1972) a Spanish former cyclist.

Major results
2001
 1st Stage 4 Vuelta al Pais Vasco
2002
 5th Prueba Villafranca de Ordizia
2003
 8th La Flèche Wallonne
2005
 4th Polynormande

Grand Tour general classification results timeline

References

1972 births
Living people
Spanish male cyclists
Sportspeople from the Province of Burgos
Cyclists from Castile and León